Fanny Carby (2 February 1925 – 20 September 2002) was a British character actress.  She had two different roles on Coronation Street: she played Mary Hornigold in 1965, then in 1987 she took the role of Vera Duckworth's domineering mother, Amy Burton, a role she played into the following year. Fanny's other credits include Street spin-off Pardon the Expression, On The Buses, Sykes, The Bill, In Sickness and in Health and Goodnight Sweetheart.

On stage, she was a founder member of Joan Littlewood's Theatre Workshop, and appeared in Oh, What a Lovely War in London and on Broadway; and also in its film version, for director Richard Attenborough.

Selected filmography

Operation Diplomat (1952, TV Series) as Mrs. Dobson
The Pickwick Papers (1952-1953, TV Series) as Mary
BBC Sunday-Night Theatre (1952-1959, TV Series) as Prostitute / Waitress / Maisie / Party guest / Joan / Agnes / Gwen
Meet Mr. Lucifer (1953) as Lady in Street (uncredited)
The Million Pound Note (1954) as Nursemaid in Belgrave Square (uncredited)
Father Brown (1954) as Prostitute in Police Van (uncredited)
Lost (1956) as Nanny in the Park (uncredited)
Theatre Royal (1956, TV Series) as Neighbour
ITV Play of the Week (1956, TV Series) as Nurse
Women Without Men (1956) as Brooker (uncredited)
Blonde Bait (1956) as Brooker (uncredited)
The Crime of the Century (1956, TV Series) as Waitress
The Secret Place (1957) as Woman with Pram (uncredited)
Love and Mr. Lewisham (1959, TV Series) as Girl Student
The Kitchen (1961) as Winnie
Never Back Losers (1961) as Charwoman
The Edgar Wallace Mystery Theatre (1962, TV Series) as Mrs. Wall
The Traitors (1962) as Angry Mother in Surgery
Some People (1962) as Johnnie's Mother
Maigret (1962, TV Series) as Concierge
The Share Out (1962) as Mrs. Wall
Sparrows Can't Sing (1963) as Lil
What a Crazy World (1963) as Dolly
Crossroads (1981, TV Series) as Rene Haines
Pardon the Expression (1965-1966) as Mrs. Field / Fiona McBride
The Idol (1966) as Barmaid
Out of the Unknown (1966, TV Series) as Miss Mitkin
The Family Way (1966) as Mrs. Stone
Adam Adamant Lives! (1967, TV Series) as Dolly
Till Death Us Do Part (1967, TV Series) as Woman
How I Won the War (1967) as Mrs. Clapper
The White Bus (1967) as a Supporter
Mrs Thursday (1967, TV Series) as Agnes Blakey
Journey to the Unknown (1968, TV Series) as Housekeeper (uncredited)
I Start Counting (1969) as minor role (uncredited)
Oh! What a Lovely War (1969) as Mill Girl
Junket 89 (1970) as Mrs. Trowser-Legge
Nearest and Dearest (1970) as Marlene Fitton
One Brief Summer (1971) as Mrs. Shaw
On the Buses (1971, TV Series) as Gladys
A Day in the Death of Joe Egg (1972) as Nun
The Trouble with 2B (1972) as Miss Greenleaf
Love Thy Neighbour (1974, TV Series) as Eddie's Mother In Law
The Sweeney (1978) S4E1 as Dot Plummer
Let's Get Laid (1978) as Lady in Phone Booth
The Elephant Man (1980) as Mrs. Kendal's Dresser
Loophole (1981) as Cleaning Lady
Fanny Hill (1983) as Old wench (uncredited)
Cockles (1984, TV series) as Madame Rosa
Lassiter (1986) as Old Lady
Bert Rigby, You're a Fool (1989) as Aunt Aggie
Mrs Dalloway (1997) as Singer

References

External links

1925 births
2002 deaths
20th-century British actresses
British stage actresses
British film actresses
British television actresses
Place of birth missing
Actresses from Birmingham, West Midlands
People from Sutton Coldfield